The Chițiu is a left tributary of the river Jiu in Romania. Its source is in the Parâng Mountains. It flows into the Jiu near the Lainici Monastery, in the Jiu Gorge.

References

Rivers of Romania
Rivers of Gorj County